The 2014–15 Brown Bears men's basketball team represented Brown University during the 2014–15 NCAA Division I men's basketball season. The Bears, led by third year head coach Mike Martin, played their home games at the Pizzitola Sports Center and were members of the Ivy League. They finished the season 13–18, 4–10 in Ivy League play to finish in a tie for seventh place.

Previous season 
The Bears finished the season 15–14, 7–7 in Ivy League play to finish in fifth place. They were invited to the CollegeInsider.com Tournament (CIT) where they lost in the first round to Holy Cross.

Roster

Schedule

|-
!colspan=9 style="background:#321414; color:#FFFFFF;"| Non-conference regular season

|-
!colspan=9 style="background:#321414; color:#FFFFFF;"| Conference regular season

References

Brown Bears men's basketball seasons
Brown
Brown
Brown